Operational Land Forces Command - Army Operational Command (COMFOTER - COE) is the Italian Army's major command tasked with the operational and administrative control of most of its combat forces. COMFOTER - COE reports directly to the Chief of Staff of the Italian Army. The command is based in Rome.

History 
The Operational Land Forces Command - Army Operational Command traces its origins back to the Operational Land Forces Command established in 1997.

1997 - 2016: Operational Land Forces Command 
The Operational Land Forces Command (COMFOTER) was established in Verona on 1 October 1997 following the reform of the military who attributed hierarchical supremacy of the Chief of the Defence Staff.
It brought together in a single organization all the units engaged in combat, combat support, combat service support and in communication and information systems, which together amounted to about 80% of the Italian Army. Initially it was part of the Allied Land Forces Southern Europe (LANDSOUTH), with whom he shared the headquarters of the command, which then broke away, when the Allied Land Forces Command in Southern Europe in 2004 was transferred to Madrid, and had four commands:
 Supports Command;
 Command of projection forces; 
 1st Command of the Defence Forces;
 2nd Command of the Defence Forces;
 Alpine troops Command.

Until 30 September 2016, COMFOTER controlled
 Division "Friuli"
 2nd Defence Forces Command
 Alpine troops Command
 Army Signals and Information Command
 Army Aviation Command
 NATO Rapid Deployable Corps – Italy
 Paratroopers Brigade "Folgore"
 Artillery Command
 Anti-Aircraft Command
 Engineering Command
The headquarters of COMFOTER in Verona was Carli Palace, even if the command department is located at the Dalla Bona barracks of Verona.

2016 - present: Operational Land Forces Command - Army Operational Command 
The Operational Land Forces Command - Army Operational Command was established on 1 October 2016, after the splitting of the Operational Land Forces Command in the Operational Land Forces Command - Army Operational Command (COMFOTER - COE) itself and in the Operational Land Forces Support Command.

The 2013 Revision Plan of the Ground Military Instrument of the Army Staff gave to the Operational Land Forces Support Command (COMFOTER SPT), to the Operational Forces Command - North (COMFOP NORD), to the Operational Forces Command - South (COMFOP SUD) and to the Alpine Troops Command (COMTA) a chain of command independent from the COMFOTER, while maintaining the newly established COMFOTER COE directly under the Chief of Staff of the Italian Army.

List of commanders 
The Operational Land Forces Command had nine Commanders:
 Ten. Gen. Giuseppe Ardito (1997 - 2001)
 Ten. Gen. Alberto Ficuciello (2001 - 2003)
 Ten. Gen. Antonio Quintana (2003)
 Gen. C.A. Cosimo D'Arrigo (2003 - 2005)
 Gen. C.A. Bruno Iob (2005 - 2008)
 Gen. C.A. Armando Novelli (2008 - 2010)
 Gen. C.A. Francesco Tarricone (2010 - 2012)
 Gen. C.A. Roberto Bernardini (2012 - 2014)
 Gen. C.A. Alberto Primicerj (2014 - 2016)

As of 2020, the Operational Land Forces Command - Army Operational Command has had two commanders:
 Gen. C.A. Riccardo Marchiò /2017 - 2018)
 Gen. C.A. Federico Bonato (2018 - present)

Mission 
The Operational Land Forces Command - Army Operational Command plans, organizes and conducts the delegated operations by delegation of the Chief of the Defence Staff or the Deputy Commander of the Joint Operational Command (VCOM OPS).

The Command constitutes the ground-based component command of the Deputy Commander of the Joint Operational Command for the planning, organization, conduct and support of operations that do not require a deployed land component command or plan, organize and monitor the phases that precede the deployment 1of an land component command in readiness.

For operational aspects, although the COMFOTER-COE no longer has direct responsibility for the various Maneuver Brigades, it remains responsible for elaborating guidelines for preparing and training the Commands and Units, supervising and generating the forces and contingent planning engaged in national and international missions and operations.

Organization 
The Commander of the Operational Land Forces Command controls both units and commands and a direct-collaboration military apparatus.

Operational Land Forces Command - Army Operational Command 
The Operational Land Forces Command - Army Operational Command is subdivided in some subordinate bodies:
 Commander's Secretariat;
 Planning, Programming and Budget Section;
 COMFOTER COE General Staff;
 COMFOTER COE General Staff Office
 COMFOTER COE Chief of General Staff's Office
 Operations General Staff;
 Operations General Staff Secretariat
 Plans Office
 Operations Office
 Operations Support Office
 Information Office
 Special Operations Section
 Preparation General Staff
 Preparation General Staff Secretariat
 Training Office
 Preparation Office
 Simulation and Training Technologies Office

Organization 

As of 2022 the Operational Land Forces Command - Army Operational Command controls the following subordinate commands:

  Operational Land Forces Command and Army Operational Command, in Rome
  Division "Acqui", in Capua (Campania)
  Army Special Forces Command, at Camp Darby (Tuscany)
  Army Aviation Command, in Viterbo (Lazio)
  Army Simulation and Validation Center, in Civitavecchia (Lazio)

Notes

External links

Commands of the Italian Army (post-1946)
Military units and formations established in 1997
Military units and formations disestablished in 2016
Military units and formations established in 2016